The 2009 California Redwoods season was the first and only season for the California Redwoods. In the United Football League's Premiere Season, the team finished with a 2–4 record and in third place. This team is now known as the Sacramento Mountain Lions.

Draft

The draft took place on June 19, 2009. Those selected were among participants in earlier workouts held in Orlando as well as Las Vegas. Once a player was picked by a team, his rights were held by that team should he elect to play in the UFL.

Personnel

Staff

Roster

Schedule

Standings

Game summaries

Week 1: at Las Vegas Locomotives

Week 2: vs. New York Sentinels

Week 3: at Florida Tuskers

Week 4: at New York Sentinels

Week 6: vs. Las Vegas Locomotives

Week 7: vs. Florida Tuskers

California Redwoods Season, 2009
Sacramento Mountain Lions seasons
California Redwoods